The 1964 Rameswaram cyclone (also known as the Dhanushkodi cyclone) was regarded as one of the most powerful storms to ever strike India on record. The system was first identified as an area of low pressure over the Andaman Sea on December 15. Following interaction with a tropical wave, it began to develop and became a depression by December 18. Increasingly rapid intensification ensued over the following days with the cyclone attaining hurricane-force winds around 5°N the next day. Weakening somewhat, the storm soon struck Tamil Nadu. Rapid weakening followed once the cyclone was onshore and it degenerated into a depression on December 24 as it emerged over the Arabian Sea. The system later dissipated on December 26 over open water.

Meteorological history

On December 15, 1964, an area of low pressure was identified over the southern Andaman Sea. Remaining nearly stationary, a tropical wave soon interacted with the low and allowed the system to consolidate into a depression two days later. A large area of showers and thunderstorms covered much of the southern Bay of Bengal and Andaman Sea. On December 18, a ship with the callsign JMAG reported  winds and a barometric pressure of 1005.5 mbar (hPa). Based on this report, the India Meteorological Department (IMD) classified the system as a deep depression. Over the following days, the system quickly intensified as it began moving slowly westward. By December 19, it became a severe cyclonic storm and soon acquired hurricane-force winds early on December 20 while near 5°N. The cyclone became one of only a handful of system to attain such an intensity close to the equator. Moving more west-northwesterly, the cyclone continued to deepen as it approached southern India. Several prominent banding features were present, with one such feature, extending over  crossing the equator while maintaining a cyclonic arc. Clouds associated with the cyclone extended as far as  into the Southern Hemisphere.

Several vessels encountered the storm, with one reporting  winds early on December 22. That day winds along the coast of Ceylon increased; the storm accelerated during this time as well. Early on December 23, the cyclone struck the northern tip of Ceylon and turned back toward the west-northwest. This ranked the system as a modern-day super cyclonic storm. Additionally, the IMD estimated its central pressure to have been, at most, 970 mbar (hPa). Weakening somewhat, the storm soon struck Tamil Nadu, south of Tondi. Once onshore, the cyclone rapidly weakened, becoming a depression before emerging over the Arabian Sea on December 24. The system degenerated into a remnant low later that day and dissipated over open waters on December 26.

Impact 
At least 1,800 people lost their lives as a result of the cyclone.

On December 22, the powerful cyclone struck northern areas of Ceylon and caused catastrophic damage. According to survivors, a storm surge of  swept across the area. Initial reports stated that 250 people lost their lives with thousands missing. About 5000 houses and 700 fishing boats were destroyed in the Jaffna district of Ceylon. The district's paddy crop was also destroyed. Other badly hit areas include Mannar and Trincomallee. The Trincomallee port suffered severe damage rendering it inoperable. The economic damage caused in Ceylon was estimated at Rs. 200 million. About 350 Ceylonese fishermen were missing at sea.

At least 1,000 people were killed on the island and many more were left unaccounted for. An unofficial estimate stated that the death toll would likely exceed 2,000. The government regarded it as, "the greatest tragedy to ever hit Ceylon."

The effects of the cyclone were felt mostly in Pamban Island, which lies between the Indian mainland and Ceylon. More than 3000 people, many of them tourists and pilgrims, were stranded on the island. The total damage to property was estimated at $150 million.

On December 23, an estimated  storm surge struck the town of Dhanuskodi on the south-eastern edge of the island, submerging the town and overturning the Pamban-Dhanuskodi passenger train killing all 200 passengers on board. The town, an important transit point between India and Ceylon, was completely destroyed and has not been rebuilt since. Prior to the cyclone, the town had been an important commercial centre with a railway station, a customs office, post and telegraphs office, two medical institutions, one railway hospital, a panchayat union dispensary, a higher elementary school and port offices. A port had been functioning since 1 March 1914. At least 800 people were killed in Dhanushkodi alone.

Four radio operators remained in Dhanuskodi and risked their lives to continue broadcasting during the storm. They were ultimately caught up in the storm surge but survived by clinging to the Pamban Bridge for 12 hours. The Indian Government later honored and rewarded them for their dedication.

Aftermath
The scale of the disaster left villages isolated for at least three days and without food or clean water. Communication lines were severely damaged and hampered relief efforts. By December 26, relief supplies were delivered to 14 villages by the Ceylonese Air Force. Britain, Cuba, West Germany, and the United States offered aid to Ceylon.

Reconstruction of the Pamban Bridge was deemed a priority and initially expected to take six months to complete. However, E. Sreedharan, an engineer tasked on the project, managed to have the railway bridge finished in 45 days. A stable road connection was built in the following years.

In Mandapam, the cyclone's surge created five tidal pools over a  stretch of coastline. Three of the pools had higher than normal salinity coupled with below-average silicate content and were colonized by Peridinium. The other two featured opposite levels of salinity and silicate and were inhabited by Pyrocystis fusiformis. All five featured bioluminescence as a result. A study of these pools in 1965 showed a, "clear succession of organisms", with species of Penaeidae (Prawn), one species of amphipoda, one species of crab, and Acetes inhabiting the pools. Researchers also found a few Sepioteuthis and tintinnid. Lastly, 46 species of coastal fish were documented. Offshore, catastrophic damage occurred to coral reefs, with Echinopora lamellosa, Montipora foliosa, and alcyonarians being killed in large numbers. At Manacadu Point, near Mandapam, an elevated coral colony of Faviids and Porites was completely wiped out. In the eight years following the storm, colonies showed substantial growth across the Palk Strait, with Acropora corymbosa covering 25–30% of the reefs. Colonies of alcyonarians showed little sign of rejuvenation, however. Along the immediate coastline, the large-scale stirring of sand made areas unsuitable for coral and were not expected to ever regrow.

References

1964 in India
1964 in Ceylon
Tropical cyclones in India
Tropical cyclones in Sri Lanka
1960s in Tamil Nadu
Disasters in Tamil Nadu
Super cyclonic storms
1964 North Indian Ocean cyclone season